The 1993 Players Championship was a golf tournament in Florida on the PGA Tour, held  at TPC Sawgrass in Ponte Vedra Beach, southeast of Jacksonville. It was the twentieth Players Championship. 

Nick Price set a scoring record of 270 (−18) at the Stadium Course and finished five strokes ahead of runner-up Bernhard Langer.  Price bettered the previous record by three strokes, set by Mark McCumber in 1988 and equaled by Davis Love III in 1992.  Price's record was short-lived, as Greg Norman broke it by six strokes with 264 (−24) the following year.

Defending champion Davis Love III finished 23 strokes back, in a tie for 67th place.

Venue

Eligibility requirements 
The top 125 PGA Tour members from the final 1992 Official Money List
Designated players
Any foreign player meeting the requirements of a designated player, whether or not he is a PGA Tour member
Winners in the last 10 calendar years of The Players Championship, Masters Tournament, U.S. Open, PGA Championship, and World Series of Golf
British Open winners since 1990
Six players, not otherwise eligible, designated by The Players Championship Committee as "special selections"
To complete a field of 144 players, those players in order, not otherwise eligible, from the 1993 Official Money List, as of the completion of the Nestle Invitational

Source:

Field
John Adams, Fulton Allem, Billy Andrade, Paul Azinger, Ian Baker-Finch, Dave Barr, Chip Beck, Ronnie Black, Phil Blackmar, Jay Don Blake, Bill Britton, Mark Brooks, Billy Ray Brown, Brad Bryant, Mark Calcavecchia, Mark Carnevale, Brian Claar, Keith Clearwater, Russ Cochran, John Cook, Fred Couples, Ben Crenshaw, John Daly, Marco Dawson, Jay Delsing, Mike Donald, Ed Dougherty, David Edwards, Joel Edwards, Steve Elkington, Ernie Els, Bob Estes, Brad Fabel, Brad Faxon, Rick Fehr, Ed Fiori, Bruce Fleisher, Anders Forsbrand, Dan Forsman, David Frost, Fred Funk, Jim Gallagher Jr., Robert Gamez, Buddy Gardner, Kelly Gibson, Bob Gilder, Bill Glasson, Wayne Grady, Hubert Green, Ken Green, Scott Gump, Jay Haas, Gary Hallberg, Dan Halldorson, Jim Hallet, Donnie Hammond, Dudley Hart, Nolan Henke, Scott Hoch, P. H. Horgan III, Mike Hulbert, Ed Humenik, John Huston, John Inman, Hale Irwin, Lee Janzen, Tony Johnstone, Tom Kite, Steve Lamontagne, Neal Lancaster, Bernhard Langer, Tom Lehman, Wayne Levi, Bruce Lietzke, Bob Lohr, Davis Love III, Andrew Magee, Jeff Maggert, John Mahaffey, Roger Maltbie, Dick Mast, Billy Mayfair, Blaine McCallister, Mark McCumber, Jim McGovern, Rocco Mediate, Phil Mickelson, Larry Mize, Gil Morgan, Jodie Mudd, Larry Nelson, Greg Norman, Mark O'Meara, Brett Ogle, José María Olazábal, Masashi Ozaki, Naomichi Ozaki, Craig Parry, Steve Pate, Corey Pavin, Calvin Peete, David Peoples, Kenny Perry, Peter Persons, Dan Pohl, Don Pooley, Nick Price, Dillard Pruitt, Tom Purtzer, Mike Reid, Larry Rinker, Loren Roberts, Dave Rummells, Gene Sauers, Ted Schulz, Tom Sieckmann, Scott Simpson, Joey Sindelar, Vijay Singh, Jeff Sluman, Mike Smith, Mike Springer, Craig Stadler, Mike Standly, Payne Stewart, Curtis Strange, Mike Sullivan, Hal Sutton, Lance Ten Broeck, Doug Tewell, David Toms, Kirk Triplett, Bob Tway, Greg Twiggs, Howard Twitty, Lanny Wadkins, Duffy Waldorf, Denis Watson, Tom Watson, D. A. Weibring, Mark Wiebe, Jim Woodward, Ian Woosnam, Robert Wrenn, Fuzzy Zoeller, Richard Zokol

Round summaries

First round
Thursday, March 25, 1993

Source:

Second round
Friday, March 26, 1993

Source:

Third round
Saturday, March 27, 1993

Source:

Final round
Sunday, March 28, 1993

References

External links
The Players Championship website

1993
1993 in golf
1993 in American sports
1993 in sports in Florida
March 1993 sports events in the United States